Bak Hui-jung (1364–?) was a scholar-official of the Joseon Dynasty Korea in 14th and 15th centuries.

He was also diplomat and ambassador, representing Joseon Dynasty interests in a diplomatic mission to the Ashikaga shogunate in Japan.

1423 mission to Japan
King Sejong dispatched a diplomatic mission to Japan in 1423. This embassy to court of Ashikaga Yoshinori was led by Bak Hui-jung.

The delegation from the Joseon court traveled to Kyoto in response to a message sent by the Japanese shogun; and also, the delegation was charged with conveying an offer to send a copy of a rare Buddhist text.

A diplomatic mission conventionally consisted of three primary figures—the main envoy, the vice-envoy, and a document official. Also included were one or more official writers or recorders who created a detailed account of the mission.  In this instance, the vice-envoy was Yi Ye,  who would return to Japan in 1432 as ambassador.

The Japanese hosts may have construed these mission as tending to confirm a Japanocentric world order.  The Joseon diplomats were more narrowly focused in negotiating protocols for Joseon-Japan diplomatic relations.

Recognition in the West
Bak Hui-jung's historical significance was confirmed when his mission was specifically mentioned in a widely distributed history published by the Oriental Translation Fund in 1834.

In the West, early published accounts of the Joseon kingdom are not extensive, but they are found in Sangoku Tsūran Zusetsu (published in Paris in 1832), and in Nihon ōdai ichiran (published in Paris in 1834).  Joseon foreign relations and diplomacy are explicitly referenced in the 1834 work.

See also
 Joseon diplomacy
 Joseon missions to Japan
 Joseon tongsinsa

Notes

References

 Daehwan, Noh.  "The Eclectic Development of Neo-Confucianism and Statecraft from the 18th to the 19th Century," Korea Journal (Winter 2003).
 Kang, Etsuko Hae-jin . (1997). Diplomacy and Ideology in Japanese-Korean Relations: from the Fifteenth to the Eighteenth Century. Basingstoke, Hampshire; Macmillan. ; 
 Titsingh, Isaac, ed. (1834). [Siyun-sai Rin-siyo/Hayashi Gahō, 1652], Nipon o daï itsi ran; ou,  Annales des empereurs du Japon.  Paris: Oriental Translation Fund of Great Britain and Ireland.  OCLC  84067437
 Walraven, Boudewijn and Remco E. Breuker. (2007). Korea in the middle: Korean studies and area studies; Essays in Honour of Boudewijn Walraven. Leiden: CNWS Publications. ;

External links
 Joseon Tongsinsa Cultural Exchange Association ; 

1364 births
Year of death unknown
15th-century Korean people
Korean diplomats